Thomas E. Bunn (born c. 1959) is a former law enforcement officer and politician in the U.S. state of Oregon. A Republican, he served part of a term in the Oregon House of Representatives while two brothers served in the Oregon State Senate. A former sheriff’s deputy in Yamhill County, he later served two terms as a county commissioner. He also was mayor of Amity and a member of their city council.

Early life
Thomas Bunn was born about 1959 in Yamhill County, Oregon, to Ben and Viola (Fulgham) Bunn. Along with his twin Tim, he was the youngest of eleven children in the family with five brothers and five sisters. He grew up on the family farm near Dayton along the Yamhill River. As a child he and his brothers usually shunned outsiders and played amongst themselves. Bunn came from a political family with his grandfather once serving as mayor of Lafayette, Oregon, his father was on the same city’s school board, brother Jim Bunn served in Congress and the state legislature, and another brother Stan Bunn served in the legislature as well.

Tom graduated from Dayton High School and went on to college. He attended Northwest Nazarene College in Nampa, Idaho, where he was in the Army Reserve Officer Training Corps. Bunn graduated with a bachelor of arts degree with a focus in business from the school. His ROTC training led to a commission in the National Guard that he had joined as a private, and later let to advancement as a Lieutenant-Colonel in the Oregon Army National Guard. He also attended, but did not graduate from, Northwestern California University School of Law, a correspondence law school.

Following college he returned to Oregon and worked for seven year for the Yamhill County Sheriff’s Office as a deputy. Bunn married Lona about 1980 and they had six children; Mark, Thomas, Ukiah, Seth, McKenzie and Peter. He farmed on the family farm near Dayton, and in 1994 began working for the Yamhill County Jail.

Political career
Bunn’s first political office came as a city council member in Amity, Oregon, where he served from 1983 to 1987. He then served as mayor of the city from 1987 to 1988. In July 1992, his brother Stan resigned from his seat in the Oregon House of Representatives after being appointed to the Oregon State Senate. The next day Tom, a Republican as well, was appointed by the Yamhill County Commission to fill Stan’s seat in the House representing District 29. Brother Jim was already serving in the Senate, so there were three Bunn brothers serving in the Oregon Legislative Assembly simultaneously. Tom remained only until 1993 as the primary elections had already determined the candidates for the November election when he was appointed. He also at one time was a judge for the Yamhill Municipal Court.

In November 1994, he was elected as a commissioner of Yamhill County. While commissioner he worked to pass a county ordinance that prohibited the selling or making of drug paraphernalia in 1995, and twice tried to ban the possession of marijuana seeds, once in 1996 and again in 1997. As a commissioner in 1997 he wrote a law that prohibited county employees from facilitating an abortion. The law was then challenged by the American Civil Liberties Union as unconstitutional at both the state and federal levels.

Bunn won re-election to a second four-year term on the commission. In 1999, brother Jim, who had lost a re-election bid to Congress in 1996 and was working at the county jail, applied for appointment to be county treasurer. Tom recused himself from the interviewing process, but voted to break a tie on the commission to appoint his brother after receiving advice from the county attorney that it would not be inappropriate. The incident led to an ethics investigation in which the complaint was dismissed, and Jim resigned from the position prior to taking office. Following the incident, Tom recused himself from any possible conflict of interest and regularly read state ethics opinions. In 2002, he lost his bid for re-election.

References

External links
Radio project beset with troubles - News-Register

County commissioners in Oregon
Republican Party members of the Oregon House of Representatives
Mayors of places in Oregon
Living people
Northwest Nazarene University alumni
People from Lafayette, Oregon
Oregon city council members
Law enforcement in Oregon
People from Dayton, Oregon
Year of birth missing (living people)